The Bend Bandits were a minor league baseball team located in Bend, Oregon.  The team played in the independent Western Baseball League, and was not affiliated with any Major League Baseball team.  Their home stadium was Vince Genna Stadium.

The Bandits were founded in 1995 and ceased operations in 2000, though their last season was in 1998. Their mascot was Rowdy the Rebel Raccoon.

References

Western Baseball League teams
Sports in Bend, Oregon
1995 establishments in Oregon
2000 disestablishments in Oregon
Baseball teams established in 1995
Professional baseball teams in Oregon
Sports clubs disestablished in 2000
Defunct baseball teams in Oregon
Defunct independent baseball league teams